The 2021 Japanese mixed doubles curling Olympic trials were held from September 18 to 20 at the Wakkanai City Midori Sports Park in Wakkanai, Japan. The winning pair of Chiaki Matsumura and Yasumasa Tanida earned the right to represent Japan at the Olympic Qualification Event where they finished with a 2–4 record, not advancing to the 2022 Winter Olympics in Beijing, China.

The event was held in a double round robin format between three teams: the 2020 Japanese Mixed Doubles champions Chiaki Matsumura and the Yasumasa Tanida, the 2021 Japanese Mixed Doubles champions Yurika Yoshida and Yuta Matsumura and the points leaders on the World Curling Tour as of January 1, 2021 Tomoko Takeda and Naomasa Takeda. After the round robin, the top two teams advanced to a best-of-three series to determine the champion.

Teams
The teams are listed as follows:

Round-robin standings
Final round-robin standings

Round-robin results
All draw times are listed in Japan Standard Time (UTC+09:00).

Draw 1
Saturday, September 18, 8:00

Draw 2
Saturday, September 18, 12:00

Draw 3
Saturday, September 18, 16:00

Draw 4
Sunday, September 19, 8:00

Draw 5
Sunday, September 19, 12:00

Draw 6
Sunday, September 19, 16:00

Championship Round

Game 1
Monday, September 20, 10:30

Game 2
Monday, September 20, 15:30

See also
2021 Japanese Olympic Curling Trials

References

External links
Official Website

2021 in Japanese sport
Curling at the 2022 Winter Olympics
September 2021 sports events in Japan
Olympic Curling Trials
Japan at the Winter Olympics
Sport in Hokkaido